Branden Steineckert (born April 21, 1978) is the drummer for the punk rock band Rancid and a founding member and  previous drummer of the Used.

Biography 
Steineckert is an avid soccer fan and supporter of Real Salt Lake, a Major League Soccer (MLS) club based in Sandy, Utah. He is a season ticket holder and writer of the official team chant 'Believe'.

Branden was born in Pocatello, Idaho, and was raised in a Mormon family which moved more than twenty times during his youth. He picked up skateboarding at an early age because his friends skated. When Branden was 11 years old, his father, Neil Steineckert, died by suicide, so he picked up drumming as a way to release his anger and to relieve him of his troubles.

Branden learned to play the drums because his late father had played drums at around his age. He was a founding member of Strange Itch, a band that would later become The Used, and would go on to achieve success, earning a platinum and gold album.

When asked in an interview what he would be doing if he were not a musician, he stated he would be "skateboarding".

On November 3, 2006, it was announced that Steineckert would be playing drums for Rancid until the end of their tour. He replaced their drummer of 15 years, Brett Reed. On the tour, Rancid members stated that Steineckert would be a permanent addition to the band (also noted on the official Used fansite). In the August 2009 issue of DRUM! Magazine, Steineckert commented on how quickly things moved as soon as he began to play with Rancid: "It was nuts. My first show, I was playing songs I'd never played even on a drum set, in front of 2,500 kids in England." Branden's first recording with the band was their 2009 album Let the Dominoes Fall, although it had been in the writing process since 2005, a year before he joined. He also appeared on their eighth album Honor Is All We Know, which was released on October 27, 2014.

In late 2010 Steineckert filled in for Goldfinger's drummer (Darrin Pfeiffer) for a few West Coast shows due to prior arrangements.

Discography 
 Strange Itch
Strange Itch (1998)

 Dumb Luck
The Naked Truth (2000)

 Apocalypse Radio
Apocalypse Radio, (EP, 2001)
One More Revolution (2002)
Apocalypse Radio (2010)

 The Used

Demos from the Basement (2001)
The Used (2002)
Maybe Memories (2003)
In Love and Death (2004)

 Rancid
Let the Dominoes Fall (2009)
Honor Is All We Know (2014)
 Trouble Maker (2017)

Producing 
The Used Demos from the Basement (June 2001)
The Eyeliners, (2003)
The Chemistry, (2003)
Broke City The Answer, (2005–2006)
Return To Sender, (2007)
Searchlight, (2007)
Searchlight, Resident Evil: Extinction Soundtrack, (2007)

Studio drum work 
Shane Hurley (Left & Right) Fashion Rocks, (2003)
Mercy Killers Give Em The Boot 4, (2004)
A Perfect Circle (The Outsider Remix) Resident Evil 2: Apocalypse Soundtrack, (2004)
Alex Warren & Danny Lohner (The Scientist) Wicker Park Soundtrack, (2004)
Secondhand Serenade Forthcoming Album, (2007)
Resistor Radio Beggars Cuisine, (2009)

References

External links 
 
 Branden Steineckert's MySpace
 Interview With Jeph Howard And Branden Steineckert
 DRUM! Magazine interview
 Twenty Twenty Skateboards
 Producer of upcoming band BROKE 

1978 births
Alternative rock drummers
American alternative rock musicians
American punk rock drummers
American male drummers
Living people
Musicians from Idaho
People from Pocatello, Idaho
Rancid (band) members
The Used members
20th-century American drummers
21st-century American drummers